Mirano Kita (born 16 February 2006) is a Japanese rhythmic gymnast. She represents her country in international competitions.

Personal life 
Mirano began the sport at age five. She was influenced by her older sister, Sumire, who also competes in rhythmic gymnastics at the international level.

Career 
Kita debuted at the 1st Junior World Championships in Moscow, placing 17th in teams, 29th with rope, 40th with ball, 19th with clubs and 8th with ribbon.

In 2022 she became a senior, competing at the World Cup in Portimão ending 14th in the All-Around, 13th with hoop, 19th with ball, 11th with clubs and 18th with ribbon. She was then selected for the Asian Championships in Pattaya along her sister and the senior group, winning bronze in the team category. In August she competed at the Word Cup in Cluj-Napoca, taking 29th place in the All-Around, 34th with hoop, 28th with ball, 28th with clubs and 23rd with ribbon.

References 

2006 births
Living people
Japanese rhythmic gymnasts
Sportspeople from Kagawa Prefecture
21st-century Japanese women